In addition to his orchestral and vocal compositions, Anton Bruckner composed a few works for chamber ensembles during his stays in Linz and Vienna.

Linz period
After the end of Sechter's tuition, Bruckner studied by Otto Kitzler to exercise further in orchestration. During this period (1862-1863) he composed the following works for string quartet:
 Scherzi in F major and G minor, WAB 209. The performances can be heard on YouTube and on John Berky's site.
 The String Quartet in C minor, WAB 111, was composed between 28 July and 7 August 1862 as a further student exercise.
 Rondo in C minor, WAB 208. After the completion of the composition of the String Quartet, Kitzler tasked Bruckner with writing a new, more fully developed final rondo for the Quartet.

During the period following Kitzler's tuition Bruckner composed the following work:
 Abendklänge (Evening harmonies), WAB 110, is a 36-bar long character piece in E minor for violin and piano, which Anton Bruckner composed on 7 June 1866 for Hugo von Grienberger.

Vienna period
During his stay in Vienna, Bruckner composed the following works for viola quintet:
 The String Quintet in F major, WAB 112, was composed between December 1878 and July 1879 at the request of Joseph Hellmesberger, Sr. and was dedicated to Duke Max Emanuel of Bavaria.
 The Intermezzo in D minor, WAB 113, was composed on 21 December 1879. It was intended to replace the scherzo of the String Quintet, which Hellmesberger found too challenging for the group to perform.

References

Sources 
 Anton Bruckner: Sämtliche Werke, Band XXV: Das Kitzler Studienbuch (1861-1863), facsimile, Musikwissenschaftlicher Verlag der Internationalen Bruckner-Gesellschaft, Paul Hawkshaw and Erich Wolfgang Partsch (Editors), Vienna, 2015
 Anton Bruckner: Sämtliche Werke: Band XIII/1: Streichquartett C-Moll Musikwissenschaftlicher Verlag der Internationalen Bruckner-Gesellschaft, Leopold Nowak (Editor), Vienna, 1955
 Anton Bruckner: Sämtliche Werke: Band XII/1: Rondo C-Moll, Musikwissenschaftlicher Verlag der Internationalen Bruckner-Gesellschaft, Leopold Nowak (Editor), Vienna, 1985 
 Anton Bruckner – Sämtliche Werke, Band XII/7: Abendklänge for violin and piano, Musikwissenschaftlicher Verlag der Internationalen Bruckner-Gesellschaft, Walburga Litschauer (editor), Vienna, 1995
 Anton Bruckner: Sämtliche Werke: Band XIII/2: Streichquintett F-Dur / Intermezzo D-Moll, Musikwissenschaftlicher Verlag der Internationalen Bruckner-Gesellschaft, Gerold W. Gruber (Editor), Vienna, 2007
 Uwe Harten, Anton Bruckner. Ein Handbuch. , Salzburg, 1996. .
 Cornelis van Zwol, Anton Bruckner 1824-1896 - Leven en werken, uitg. Thoth, Bussum, Netherlands, 2012.